Fabio Strauss (born 6 August 1994) is an Austrian professional footballer who plays for FC Blau-Weiß Linz, as a defender.

Career
Born in Salzburg, Strauss has played for SV Austria Salzburg and SV Grödig.

On 28 August 2020, he joined FC Blau-Weiß Linz.

References

External links
Fabio Strauss at OEFB

1994 births
Living people
Austrian footballers
SV Austria Salzburg players
SV Grödig players
FC Admira Wacker Mödling players
FC Blau-Weiß Linz players
Austrian Football Bundesliga players
2. Liga (Austria) players
Association football defenders